Al Silvani (April 26, 1910 – January 10, 1996) was an American boxing trainer and actor.

As one of the most sought-after trainers in the business, Silvani trained over twenty world champions, including Jake LaMotta, Henry Armstrong, Carmen Basilio, Fritzie Zivic, Pone Kingpetch, Rocky Graziano, Ingemar Johansson, and Lou Ambers.

He also had a lengthy career in the film industry as an actor, stunt man, and as a technical advisor—most noteworthy a lead role in Robin and the Seven Hoods. He also appeared in From Here to Eternity, Ocean's Eleven, Stir Crazy, Every Which Way But Loose, The Gauntlet,  Rocky, Rocky II and Rocky III.

He was a close personal friend of Frank Sinatra and hung out with Sinatra's Rat Pack.

Inducted into the World Boxing Hall of Fame.

2006 California Boxing Hall of Fame Inductee.

Fighters trained

  Cisco Andrade
Alexis Argüello
  Billy Backus
Nino Benvenuti (Late in his Career 1968–71)
Tom Bogs
Mustafa Hamsho (For second Hagler fight)
Eddie Machen
Tami Mauriello
Buster Mathis
Floyd Patterson (Later in his Career)
Al Tribuani
Cleveland Williams
Robert De Niro (for his role in Raging Bull)

Death
Silvani died in the North Hollywood section of Los Angeles in 1996.

Filmography

References

The Ring magazine, Corner Men: Great Boxing Trainers - Ronald K. Fried

External links

American male film actors
Male actors from New York City
1910 births
1996 deaths
20th-century American male actors